Dietz is a surname, and may refer to:

 Albrecht Dietz (1926–2012), German entrepreneur and scientist
 August Dietz (1869–1963), a philatelist, editor and publisher
 Bernard Dietz (born 1948), German football player and manager
 Cyrus E. Dietz (1876–1929), Illinois Supreme Court Justice
 Damion Dietz (born 1971), American film writer/director
 Dick Dietz (1941–2005), American baseball player (catcher)
 Ella Dietz (1847-1920). American actress and author
 Feodor Dietz (1813–1870), German painter of battle scenes
 G. O. Dietz, American football coach and lawyer
 Hendrik Casimir II of Nassau-Dietz
 Henry Dietz, American professor and author
 Henry G. Dietz, American electrical engineer
 Howard Dietz (1896–1983), American lyric writer and librettist
 Jan Dietz (born 1945), Dutch computer scientist
 Jim Dietz (disambiguation), several people
 Michaela Dietz (born 1982), South Korean-American actress and singer
 Michael Dietz (born 1971), American actor
 Park Dietz (born 1948), American forensic psychiatrist
 Robert H. Dietz (1921–1945) United States Army soldier and a recipient of the Medal of Honor
 Robert S. Dietz (1914–1995), US-American geophysicist and oceanographer
 Sophie Dietz (1820–1887), German operatic soprano
 Steven Dietz, US-American playwright
 Thomas Dietz (born 1982), German professional juggler
 William Dietz (disambiguation), several people

Other
Dietz may also refer to:
 R. E. Dietz Company, a lighting and lantern manufacturer

See also 
 
 Diez (disambiguation)

Surnames
Surnames from given names